Acrometopia is a genus of flies in the family Chamaemyiidae.

Species
C. trevas Gaimari, 2012

References

Chamaemyiidae
Lauxanioidea genera